Gerard Baker (born 16 September 1938) is an English former footballer who made more than 200 appearances in the Football League for York City. His career ended following a cartilage injury sustained on 30 November 1968. On 20 October 1969 he enjoyed a testimonial game when York City played The Happy Wanderers (the club's 1954–55 FA Cup semi final side).

He started his career with Bolton Wanderers before joining his hometown club Wigan Athletic, where he made played 47 games in the Lancashire Combination.

References

1938 births
Living people
Footballers from Wigan
English footballers
Association football fullbacks
Wigan Athletic F.C. players
Nottingham Forest F.C. players
York City F.C. players
English Football League players